Sookha (English: The Famine) is a 1983 Hindi drama film directed by M. S. Sathyu, starring Anant Nag, C. R. Simha, Lovelin Madhu and Pankaj Dheer. Based on the Kannada novel Bara by eminent writer U. R. Ananthamurthy, the story deals with the politics of famine in Karnataka. An idealistic officer eventually succumbs to bureaucratic apathy -  famine relief arrives, but too late.

The Kannada version the film titled Bara was released in 1982, and had won National Film Award for Best Feature Film in Kannada. However, unlike the Kannada version, the film couldn't get a theatrical release, later it was shown on state-run Doordarshan channel.

At the 31st National Film Awards, it won the award for Best Feature Film on National Integration. Also at the 31st Filmfare Awards, it was awarded Filmfare Critics Award for Best Movie.

References

External links
 

Indian drama films
1983 films
1980s Hindi-language films
Films set in Karnataka
Films based on short fiction
Films about famine
Films directed by M. S. Sathyu
Best Film on National Integration National Film Award winners